Matthieu Chedid (born 21 December 1971), better known by his stage name -M-, is a French rock singer-songwriter and guitar player. Since 2018, he has been the most awarded artist at the Victoires de la Musique Awards with 13 awards, tied with Alain Bashung.

Biography
Matthieu Chedid was born in Boulogne-Billancourt, Hauts-de-Seine, France, the son of French singer Louis Chedid, and the grandson of the Egyptian-born French writer and poet of Lebanese descent Andrée Chedid who has written lyrics for him. His sisters are the music video and concert director Émilie Chedid (born in 1970) and French singer Anna Chedid (born in 1987), also known by her stage name of Nach. His brother Joseph Chedid (born in 1986), also known by his stage name of Selim, is also a French singer and a guitar and drums player.

Chedid took an interest in music early on. In 1978, at the age of six, Chedid lent his voice to the chorus of his father's hit song T'as beau pas être beau alongside older sister, Émilie. During his teenage years and early twenties, Chedid formed a few short-lasting groups such as Tam Tam , Les Bébés fous (the crazy babies) and Les Poissons Rouges (the goldfishes) with Mathieu Boogaerts and with the sons of Laurent Voulzy and Alain Souchon, Julien Voulzy and Pierre Souchon.

He has collaborated with a number of artists, both on stage and in the recording studio. Early into his solo career, Chedid was the opening act for Texas concerts. He has recorded with NTM, Sinclair, Billy Ze Kick, Brigitte Fontaine, Sean Lennon, Vanessa Paradis, and Johnny Hallyday.

Until 2008, Chedid was in a relationship with French actress Audrey Tautou.

-M- 
Chedid performs and records under the stage name -M-. Chedid created -M- as means of overcoming his shyness on stage and also as a way of distancing his work from that of his father and grandmother. The pseudonym comes from Chedid's first initial but also refers to the similar-sounding French word aime, meaning love. The character -M- is a superhero, noted for having a playful nature, and recognized for his flamboyant costumes (primarily monochrome suits with slim trousers and long jackets with upward pointed collars) and hair styled into the shape of an M.

In 1997, -M- released his first solo album Le Baptême. During this time; he played mainly solo or with the cellist Vincent Ségal. The album received overall positive critical reception, but public recognition only came a few months later, with the release of the single "Machistador".

Je dis aime

In 1999, -M- published his second album, Je dis aime a title that puns 'aime' (like/love) with 'M'. A few months later, the album was 11th on the French Charts, with more than 500,000 albums sold, thanks to a number of successful songs ("Je dis aime", "Onde Sensuelle", "Monde Virtuel", "Le complexe du corn-flakes", "Mama Sam").

Live, -M- played with Cyril Atef, Vincent Segal and DJ Shalom for the samples on some songs. He still works with his sister Emilie Chedid for the realisation of the clips. His live performance largely contributed to his success, playing on his character of -M- to transform every concert into a show. He won his first Victoire de la Musique awards for Male Artist of the Year and Concert of the Year.

"Belleville Rendez-vous" and Qui de nous deux

-M- gained international exposure through his recording of the song "Belleville Rendez-vous" for the soundtrack of the 2003 Sylvain Chomet animated film The Triplets of Belleville in both French and English.  The song, with lyrics by Chomet and music by Benoit Charest, was nominated for a 2003 Academy Award.  The music video for "Belleville Rendez-vous" uses both a live-action depiction of -M- and an animated depiction incorporated into footage from the film.

In autumn 2003, he released his 3rd album Qui de nous deux (Which one of us two) with the singles "Qui de nous deux", "La bonne étoile", "Mon ego". Softer, this album saw the birth of his first daughter, Billie, for whom an all-pink guitar was built by instrument-maker Cyril Guérin. A pink guitar can be seen in the video for "Qui de nous deux".

In 2007, he worked once again with Vanessa Paradis on her album Divinidylle, released in September 2007.

Mister Mystère

Rumors circulated before the release of his 2009 studio album, Mister Mystère, that Chedid had decided to drop the character -M- to record and perform under his given name. The album, however, was released under the name -M- but included photographs of the singer without the wild costumes and hair associated with the -M- character. The music video for the first single, "Le Roi des ombres", showed Chedid burning a tiny effigy of his alterego.

Îl, Lamomali, and Lettre infinie

In autumn 2012, he released the album, Îl, played with Lawrence Clais and Brad Thomas Ackley.

He worked with Toumani Diabaté and Sidiki Diabaté on a collective album, Lamomali, released in March 2017 The album also features Philippe Jaroussky as well as Oxmo Puccino lending a mesmeric world music flavour to it that celebrates cultural diversity and world peace.

In 2019, he released the studio album, Lettre infinie, featuring collaborations from Thomas Bangalter and Phillipe Zdar. He announced new album, R Ê V A L I T É, to be released in June of 2022.

Awards

Matthieu Chedid holds the gold place in number of Victoires de la Musique awards, with 13 awards

Discography

Albums

Studio albums

Collaborations

Live albums

Soundtracks

Rereleases

Singles

As main artist

Collaborations

Other hits

Charity
2016: "Vole" (with Nolwenn Leroy, Alain Souchon, Laurent Voulzy...)

Bibliography
 Les Âmes de Mogador (2003), with Patrice Renson : tribute to Essaouira (Maroc). A CD of ten unreleased tracks is included.
 -M-, qui de nous deux (2004), with Claude Gassian : book produced during the recording of the album Qui de nous deux
 -M- de A à Z (2005), by Mathias Goudeau
 Le monde de -M- (2005), with Marianne Chedid, Sonia Rachline and Sophie Laurent : insight on his career, with a lot of pictures
 -M- le mot dit : esthétique d'un funkistador by Marc Borbon: analysis of M's world through a fan's own experience
 Le Livre Extraordinaire de -M- by Lisa Roze: package of an archival photographs, unpublished shootings, a book, postcards, a pop-up, a new song (Si Si No No), etc.

References

External links
 Official website (flash) (French)
 Myspace site, including links and concert dates (French)
RFI Biography (English)
Interview with ‑M- (French)
-M- Chedid Online (Spanish)
Review of 'Mister Mystère' (English)
Reference website (2yeuxet1plume / Autour de Matthieu Chedid) (French)

1971 births
Living people
People from Boulogne-Billancourt
French singer-songwriters
French people of Lebanese descent
French rock guitarists
French male guitarists
21st-century French singers
21st-century guitarists
21st-century French male singers
French male singer-songwriters